Maximum Football is an upcoming gridiron football video game developed by Invictus Games Ltd.and published by Modus Games. It is the successor to Maximum Football 2020, which was formerly developed by Canuck Play. Modus Games acquired the rights to the Maxium Football series and announced the successor on September 1, 2021, on Discord. Modus Games would make a formal announcement about the game's development on February 7, 2022.

The game is scheduled to be released on Steam in the Spring of 2023 and Xbox One, Xbox Series X and Series S, PlayStation 4 and PlayStation 5 in the Fall of 2023. The team behind the game released an official trailer on February 7, 2023, one year after the original statement. This will be the first game under the new developer/publisher regime and to not include former professional player Doug Flutie.

The game is free-to-play which makes it one of the first triple-A sports video games to not have a price attached to it. The game is often compared to and rivaled to the EA Sports flagship National Football League title, Madden NFL which has drawn criticism for its lack of features that were featured in prevoius games. This comes after the hashtag #FixMaddenFranchise was trending on Twitter and other social media platforms to spread awareness of EA Sports' lack of attention to the gamemode. Madden NFL is the only game with the exclusive NFL license to include the likenesses of players and coaches into the game.

Development 
The game is developed by Invictus Games. Many videos were posted to the Maximum Football Twitter account showcasing the creation of tackling animations and other animations that will be present in the game. An update video after the announcement of the game was released on June 30, 2022, which showed developer Micah Brown showing some of the customization, physics and gameplay features in the new game. In September 2022, another development update was posted showing specifically the customization features in the game which differ from other sports games such as NBA 2K, Madden NFL and MLB: The Show. This would all lead up to the official trailer being released on February 7, 2023, where a release date was set for PC and console.

Modus Games is a video game publisher based in the United States, known for its diverse range of titles across various platforms. The company was founded in 2017 and has quickly established itself as a leading publisher in the indie game space, partnering with developers from around the world to bring their games to a wider audience. Modus Games has published a variety of critically acclaimed titles, including Trine 4: The Nightmare Prince, Remothered: Tormented Fathers, and Cris Tales, which was nominated for multiple awards at the 2020 Game Awards.

Features 
The game will feature multiple modes not seen before in the series, such as pro season mode where you can play through a professional season in a 32-team league, similar to the NFL regular season. You can also advance into the playoffs through a similar style of the NFL playoffs. There will also be a head to head mode where you can play against another player using created teams or default randomized rosters.

The other featured mode is dynasty, which derives from the now-discontinued NCAA Football video game series, where you can take on the role of a head coach in a customizable league and recruit players to join your team and get drafted. Other modes that may come in the future of the game will be a career mode similar to the one in older Madden titles called 'Superstar'.

Reception

References 

Upcoming video games scheduled for 2023
American football video games
Canadian football video games
PlayStation 4 games
PlayStation 5 games
Xbox Series X and Series S games
Xbox One games
Video games set in Canada
Maximum Games games
Multiplayer and single-player video games